is a Japanese manga series created by Hiroyuki Takei. It was serialized by Shueisha in the manga magazine Weekly Shōnen Jump between issues 3 and 14 of 2007, and collected in a single bound volume (tankōbon). After the cancellation of the series, two short stories were published inside Ultra Jump in 2009 and 2010. Following the success of the short stories, Takei decided to create a remake of the series, titled Jumbor. The new manga began serialization in Ultra Jump in August 2010 issue.

Plot
The background of story revolves around the human civilization in 3002 where destruction and challenge were brought by the harsh nature. In this era of constant war against nature and havoc, construction teams were the star of economy system, the conquering force as well as a weapon themselves, because heavy robots were used in construction works to speed up efficiency.

Baru Craw was the leader of a famous construction team for the kingdom of Dorvok. One day, as their group was about to start a reconstruction work of a tunnel which was destroyed by an earthquake, a much more powerful construction team arrived and claimed the land in no time, killing Baru who tried to protect his teammates against the cruel Genber Diode.

Baru woke up in 3007, finding himself revived in his own cloned memory transplanted inside a physical body of a five years old, and in addition to that, his body was partly mechanized. His robot arms are linked up to and directly controlled by his brain's signals. He was told that the country of Dovork is now gone and the princess Rivetta and the king Tabill disappeared. He was also told he was 'last of the series' created by the Dr. Road Docult. He created eleven Jumbors with every one of them have construction related powers like a drill, crane, shovel. Baru, Nipper and Rivetta began their journey for the restoration of the Kingdom of Dovork.

Publication
Shueisha collected the ten individual chapters into one bound volume (tankōbon), released on May 2, 2007. Between chapters, Takei put nine  and a setting data collection at the end of the volume. Shueisha re-released the series in two volumes on August 4, 2010, in a kanzenban edition called .

Tankōbon

Kanzenban

References

Further reading

External links 

Hiroyuki Takei
Seinen manga
Shōnen manga
Shueisha manga